Herrliberg-Feldmeilen is a railway station in Switzerland, situated near to the banks of Lake Zurich. The station is located adjacent to the village of Feldmeilen in the municipality of Meilen but, as its name suggests, also serves the adjacent municipality of Herrliberg. The station is on the Lake Zurich right bank railway line.

The station is served by the following passenger trains:

References

External links 

Herrliberg-Feldmeilen station on Swiss Federal Railway's web site

Railway stations in the canton of Zürich
Swiss Federal Railways stations
Meilen